Bogie is a rural locality in the Whitsunday Region, Queensland, Australia.

Geography 
The terrain is mountainous and relatively undeveloped. The principal land use is grazing on native vegetation.

The Bowen Developmental Road passes through the middle of the locality from the south-west (Springlands) to the north-east (Bowen). The Newlands railway system roughly follows the same route as the road through the locality.

History 
On 4 December 1956, the Queensland Government opened for selection a grazing lot of  being portions 33 and 34, parish of Adaleigh, County of Herbert in the Bowen Land Agent's district and the Shire of Wangaratta. It was west of the Bogie Range and the Bogie River flowed through the property. The property is known as Reedy Creek as at 2020. 

On 4 August 2022, a triple murder occurred on a cattle property in the Bogie area. One additional person was shot in the abdomen by the perpetrator, but survived the attack. The guy was the neighbour of the victims and apparently there was some property dispute.

Education 
There are no schools in Bogie. Given the extensive size of the locality and limited road network, the school options would depend on the home location. For primary schooling, the options as Osborne State School in Osborne, Gumlu State School in Gumlu, Collinsville State School in Collinsville, Merinda State School and Bowen State School both in Bowen, and Proserpine State School in Proserpine. For secondary schooling, the options are Bowen State High School in Bowen and Collinsville State High School in Collinsville. The northern and southern parts of Bogie are considered too remote for normal secondary school attendance; the options in these areas would be distance education or boarding schools.

References

External links 

 

Whitsunday Region
Localities in Queensland